Scrobipalpula daturae is a moth in the family Gelechiidae. It was described by Zeller in 1877. It is found in Colombia.

References

Scrobipalpula
Moths described in 1877